Lezzeno is a comune (municipality) in the Province of Como in the Italian region Lombardy, located about  north of Milan and about  northeast of Como.

Lezzeno borders the following municipalities: Argegno, Bellagio, Colonno, Lenno, Nesso, Ossuccio, Sala Comacina, Tremezzo, Veleso, Zelbio.

Demographic evolution

References

Cities and towns in Lombardy